Calligraphidia is a genus of moths of the family Noctuidae.

Species
Calligraphidia opulenta (Moschler, 1887)
Calligraphidia tessellata (Kenrick, 1917)

References
Natural History Museum Lepidoptera genus database

Calpinae